Major Derek Swithin Allhusen, CVO (9 January 1914 – 24 April 2000) was an English equestrian who was a 54-year-old grandfather when he rode Lochinvar to team gold and individual silver medals at the 1968 Summer Olympics in Mexico.

Derek Swithin Allhusen was born in London and educated at Eton and Trinity College, Cambridge. In 1937 he married The Hon Claudia Betterton. He served throughout the Second World War with 9th Queen's Royal Lancers, being awarded the American Silver Star in 1944.

On returning from Germany he brought back two horses with him and settled in Claxton, Norfolk. He rode one of the horses, Laura when representing Britain in the pentathlon at the 1948 Winter Olympic Games. He eventually took up eventing in 1955, riding Laura's daughter Laurien on two European Championship teams, winning a team gold medal in 1957, then team silver and individual bronze in 1959. In 1961 he bought Irish-bred Lochinvar and rode her in two winning European Championship teams (in 1967 and 1969) as well as the gold and silver at the 1968 Summer Olympics. He was offered appointment as an MBE for his achievements but declined it; feeling his team-mates Richard Meade, Jane Bullen and Reuben Jones also deserved recognition.

On his retirement from the sport he continued as a breeder and Laurien's son Laurieston was ridden to team and individual Olympic gold medals in 1972 Games in Munich, with Richard Meade in the saddle. Allhusen was president of the British Horse Society from 1986 to 1988.

Allhusen was appointed to be one of Her Majesty's Body Guard of the Honourable Corps of Gentlemen at Arms in 1963, he was appointed Standard Bearer from 1981 to 1984. He was appointed to be a Commander of the Royal Victorian Order in 1983.

In November 1955, 1956 and 1957 he was nominated as a High Sheriff of Norfolk (and appointed in March 1958) in the Queen's Bench Division of the High Court of Justice

Notes

References

External links
Obituary from The Independent

1914 births
2000 deaths
People educated at West Downs School
People educated at Eton College
Alumni of Trinity College, Cambridge
9th Queen's Royal Lancers officers
British Army personnel of World War II
Recipients of the Silver Star
Olympic equestrians of Great Britain
British male equestrians
Olympic winter pentathletes of Great Britain
Winter pentathletes at the 1948 Winter Olympics
Equestrians at the 1968 Summer Olympics
Olympic gold medallists for Great Britain
Olympic silver medallists for Great Britain
British show jumping riders
English male equestrians
English Olympic medallists
Commanders of the Royal Victorian Order
Honourable Corps of Gentlemen at Arms
High Sheriffs of Norfolk
Olympic medalists in equestrian
Medalists at the 1968 Summer Olympics
People from South Norfolk (district)